The 2010 winners of the Torneo di Viareggio (in English, the Viareggio Tournament, officially the Viareggio Cup World Football Tournament Coppa Carnevale), the annual youth football tournament held in Viareggio, Tuscany, are listed below.

Format 

The 48 teams are seeded in 12 pools, split up into 6-pool groups. Each team from a pool meets the others in a single tie. The winning club from each pool and two best runners-up from both group A and group B progress to the final knockout stage. All matches in the final rounds are single tie. The Round of 16 after envisions penalties and no extra time, while the rest of the final round matches include 30 minutes extra time and penalties to be played if the draw between teams still holds.

Participating teams
Italian teams

  Atalanta
  Bari
  Bologna
  Cesena
  Cisco Roma
  Empoli
  Fiorentina
  Genoa
  Inter Milan
  Juventus
  Lazio
  Livorno
  Mantova
  Milan
  Napoli
  Olbia
  Palermo
  Parma
  Pergocrema
  Serie D Representatives
  Reggina
  Roma
  Sambenedettese
  Sampdoria
  Sassuolo
  Siena
  Torino
  Viareggio
  Vicenza

European teams

  Anderlecht
  Belasica
  Dukla Prague
  Jedinstvo Ub
  Kaposvári Rákóczi
  Legia Warszawa
  Spartak Moscow
  Ventspils

Asian teams

  Maccabi Haifa
  Paxtakor

African Team
  Kallon

American teams

  Leme Football Club
   L.I.A.C. of New York
  Chivas Guadalajara
  Guaraní Asunción
  Grêmio
  Nacional Asunción
  Club Sol do Campo Grande

Oceanian teams
   APIA Leichhardt

Group stage

Group A

Pool 1

Pool 2

Pool 3

Pool 4

Pool 5

Pool 6

Group B

Pool 7

Pool 8

Pool 9

Pool 10

Pool 11

Pool 12

Knockout stage

Champions

Top goalscorers

10 goals
  Ciro Immobile ( Juventus)

6 goals
  Giacomo Beretta ( Milan)

4 goals

  Stefano Pettinari ( Roma)
  André Amaral ( Leme Futebol Clube)
  Irakli Shekiladze ( Empoli)
  Luca Belcastro ( Juventus)

3 goals

  Gianmario Comi ( Torino)
  Marco Giovio ( Palermo)
  Jerry Mbakogu ( Palermo)
  Manuel Fischnaller ( Juventus)
  Leonardo D'Angelo ( Serie D Representatives)
  Mischel Vazquez ( Chivas Guadalajara)
  Vincenzo Pisani ( Bari)
  Mohamed Bangura ( Kallon)
  Denis Alibec ( Internazionale)
  Benito Nicolas Viola ( Reggina)
  Rivolino Gavoci ( Cesena)
  Manuel Pucciarelli ( Empoli)

2 goals
 37 Players

Footnotes

External links
Official Site (Italian)
Results on RSSSF.COM

Torneo di Viareggio
2010 in association football
2009–10 in Italian football